Merthiolate-Iodine-Formaldehyde (MIF) is a solution used in biomedical laboratories for concentration of stool samples prior to microscopic investigation for parasites. Concentration of stool is necessary in order to raise sensitivity of microscopy, as in non-concentrated samples the likelihood of finding equivalents of actually present parasites is too low. MIF enables separation of different strata of stool matter, and sedimentation of stool particles that contain parasites (usually parasite eggs). After application of MIF, usually centrifugation is used for acceleration of sedimentation. 

The term Merthiolate indicates presence of thiomersal in the solution. Due to the hazardous qualities of thiomersal, it is no longer regularly added to MIF-solutions any more, although the abbreviation MIF is still used for the solution. Thiomersal may nevertheless be added if its preservative qualities are particularly needed, for example if stool samples have to be preserved over longer time periods (for example for teaching samples).

Content
As prepared commercially,  of MIF-solution contains:
Ethanolamine 
Ethylenediamine 
Sodium chloride 
Disodium-Tetraborate-Decahydrate 
Distilled water 

If Thiomersal is needed for preservation of the sample, add:
Thiomersal

Use
For use in laboratory situations, the MIF solution described above is combined with formaldehyde and glycerin in a distilled water dilution.

References 

Stool tests